Li Shicen (1892–1934), born Li Bangfan (李邦藩), was a Chinese philosopher and editor of advanced philosophical journals of the May Fourth Movement, such as Minduo Magazine and Education Magazine. Li is best remembered as an exponent of the thought of Nietzsche, who was among the Western thinkers most influential in China in the early Republican era.

Li Shicen belonged to circle of radical intellectuals and activists who emerged in Hunan in the early 20th century. Another was Mao Zedong. Li in fact had several contacts with Mao; as both young men wrote manuals on swimming, and Mao's later widely publicized exploit of swimming in the Yangtze River may be traced back to Li's inspiration.

Li produced a number of books and articles which are still read as expositions of Western philosophy, and are of value in understanding the reception of ideas in this era. Rensheng Zhexue (人生哲学, "Philosophies of Human Life") was his longest published work. Li produced special issues of Min Duo devoted to a number of influential philosophers including Nietzsche, Bergson and Eucken. In the early 1920s, Li's circle of friends and acquaintances included Guo Moruo and Zhu Qianzhi. 

Following a sojourn in Europe in the late 1920s, Li returned to China and announced that materialist dialectics was the "philosophy of the future." This conversion from neo-romanticism to Marxism was seen as a signal event at the time, and was a harbinger of many that were follow.

Prior to this he had been involved in scandal involving a female student. He published a Qingbian Wanzi Shu (情变万言书, "Ten Thousand Word Letter of Heartbreak") in response, and which expresses a neo-romantic philosophy typical of the era.

1892 births
1934 deaths
Republic of China philosophers
20th-century Chinese philosophers
People from Liling
Academic staff of Sun Yat-sen University